Diego Alejandro Ruíz Scheuschner (born 19 December 1980) is a former journeyman Argentine footballer who played as a striker.

Club career
Ruiz started his peripatetic playing career in  1997 at Lanús in Argentina. He then had spells in the lower leagues of Argentine football with San Telmo, Club Atlético Ñuñorco and Atlético Tucumán. In 2004, he joined Belgian side KV Kortrijk followed by Cobresal of Chile, then back to Belgium with K.A.A. Gent, and back to Chile again with Huachipato in the Liga Chilena de Fútbol, where he had his best spell as a professional. He was transferred to Romanian club CFR Cluj in 2008, just in time to be part of CFR's championship squad of 2007-08, but was loaned to Kasımpaşa in 2009. For a half a season he played in Azerbaijan for Khazar Lankaran before having his contract mutually terminated in January 2011.  He returned to Romania with FCM Târgu Mureş. In January 2012, Ruiz went back to Chile, joining newly promoted Deportes Antofagasta.

Honours

Player
CFR Cluj
 Liga I (1): 2007–08
 Romanian Cup (2): 2008, 2009
 Supercupa României (1): 2009

Universidad de Concepción
 Primera B (1): 2013 Transición

References

External links
 
 
 

1980 births
Living people
Sportspeople from San Miguel de Tucumán
Argentine footballers
Liga I players
Süper Lig players
Primera B de Chile players
Association football midfielders
Club Atlético Lanús footballers
Atlético Tucumán footballers
C.D. Huachipato footballers
Cobresal footballers
CFR Cluj players
Kasımpaşa S.K. footballers
Khazar Lankaran FK players
ASA 2013 Târgu Mureș players
C.D. Antofagasta footballers
Universidad de Concepción footballers
Deportes Iberia footballers
Argentine expatriate footballers
Expatriate footballers in Chile
Expatriate footballers in Belgium
Expatriate footballers in Romania
Expatriate footballers in Turkey
Expatriate footballers in Azerbaijan
Argentine expatriate sportspeople in Azerbaijan